The 13th Crystal Palace Trophy was a motor race, run for Formula One cars, held on 11 June 1962 at the Crystal Palace Circuit, London. The race was run over 36 laps of the circuit, and was won by British driver Innes Ireland in a Lotus 24.

Ireland arrived too late to take part in practice and had to start from the back of the grid. He won anyway, taking the lead in the first few laps. John Campbell-Jones' car retired with fuel feed problems, and he later admitted he suspected foul play.

Another Formula One race was held on the same day, the 1962 International 2000 Guineas, at Mallory Park.

Results

References

Results at Silhouet.com 

Crystal Palace Trophy